Civilian Conservation Corps Camp S-52 is a former forestry camp of the Civilian Conservation Corps (CCC) in the unincorporated community of Cusson, Minnesota, United States.  Four workshops built around 1933 survive from the time of the camp, which was one of the 25 original CCC camps established in Minnesota in the first year of the program.  The buildings were listed on the National Register of Historic Places in 1989 for their local significance in the theme of politics/government.  They were nominated for being the area's only known surviving CCC buildings.  Civilian Conservation Corps camps were typically populated with simple utilitarian structures only intended for temporary use, and thus few survive to the present day.

See also
 National Register of Historic Places listings in St. Louis County, Minnesota

References

1933 establishments in Minnesota
Buildings and structures in St. Louis County, Minnesota
Civilian Conservation Corps in Minnesota
Forestry in the United States
Government buildings completed in 1933
Government buildings on the National Register of Historic Places in Minnesota
National Register of Historic Places in St. Louis County, Minnesota
Temporary populated places on the National Register of Historic Places